Carlo Amoretti (born 16 March 1741 in Oneglia, now part of Imperia – died 23 March 1816) was an ecclesiastic, scholar, writer, and scientist. 
He entered the Augustinian order in 1757. To further his studies, he went to Pavia and Parma where he also taught ecclesiastical law.

Wide-ranging intellect
Amoretti was an Encyclopedist whose mind encompassed theology, physics, geology, paleography, geography, and art history. He translated scientific works, published or republished many rare books and manuscripts noteworthy of these being the extant codex of Antonio Pigafetta's relation of the first circumnavigation of the world by Ferdinand Magellan's fleet.

Amoretti, having fallen from the graces of the ecclesiastical order at Parma, was forced to relocate to Milan around 1771. Here he became an active member of the scientific community. He was editor of the first scientific magazine published in Milan under the title—from 1775 until 1777--Scelta di opuscoli interessanti tradotti da varie lingue renamed in 1778 Opuscoli scelti until 1803, and further renamed in 1804 as Nuovi opusculi scelti.

Polygraph
Amoretti wrote many books. Among these Memorie storiche su la vita gli studi e le opera di Leonardo da Vinci si aggiungono le memorie intorno all vita del Ch. Baldassare Oltrocchi gia Prefetto della stessa Biblioteca scritte dal suo successore Pietro Cighera (Milan, 1804) which is considered to be the first modern biography of Leonardo da Vinci.

Other works worth mention are Della raddomanzia ossia elettrometria animale ricerche fisiche e storiche (Milan, 1808), Elementi di elettrometria animale (Milan, 1816), and Viaggio da Milano ai tre laghi Maggiore, di lugano e di Como e ne' monti che li circondanoi (Milan, 1814).

Conservator, discoverer of Pigafetta
He became a conservator, officially called "Dottori del Collegio Ambrosiano", in 1797 of the Biblioteca Ambrosiana (Ambrosian Library) at Milan which is said to be the first public library in Europe having first opened its door to the public in 1609. It was as conservator at the library that the world of exploration history was turned on its head by this paleographer. James Alexander Robertson wrongly identified him as the "prefect" or officer in charge of the Ambrosiana library, an error repeated by a few who have referred to Amoretti although as far as can be ascertained not one has detected prior to this article that Amoretti is the first to assert the Limasawa=Mazaua equation. Filipino religious historiographer Miguel A. Bernad mistakenly identified Amoretti as curator of the library.

In 1797 Amoretti discovered at the Biblioteca the lost Italian manuscript of Pigafetta on Magellan's voyage, considered by most Magellan scholars as the oldest of four extant manuscripts and the most complete, although there is consensus among paleographic scholars this and all surviving codices are mere copies of an original or originals now deemed forever lost. The three other extant manuscripts are all in French of which two are conserved at the Bibliothèque Nationale, MSS 5650 and 24224, the last, viewed as the most "princely" of all, is conserved at the Beinecke Library of the Yale University Library, in the United States.

Garbled edition
Amoretti lost no time in transcribing, editing, and annotating the manuscript. He published his edition of Pigafetta in 1800 under this most formidable title Primo viaggio intorno al globo terracqueo ossia ragguaglio della navigazione alle Indie orientali per la via d'occidente fatta dal cavaliere Antonio Pigafetta patrizio vicentino sulla squadra del capit. Magaglianes negli anni 1519-1522 ora pubblicato per la prima volta, tratto da un codice MS. della Biblioteca Ambrosiana di Milano e corredato di note da C. Amoretti...con un transunto del Trattato di Navigazione dello stesso autore... Milan, 1800. The following year a French edition, translated by Amoretti himself, came out with the title Premier voyage autour du monde par le chevalier Francesco Antonio Pigafetta sur l'escadre de Magellan, pendant les années 1519-20-21-22, suivi de l'extrait du Traité de navigation du même auteur et d'une notice sur le chev. Martin de Behain. Paris, H.J. de Jansen. That same year a German translation came out. The French edition has been digitized and published at the site Europeana.

Among other things Amoretti modernized the Italian of Pigafetta's text. His edition was the basis for the writings on Magellan's expedition by Jose Toribio Medina and Francis Hill H. Guillemard whose biography of Magellan is still considered the leading work on the Portuguese navigator. Navigation historians and Magellan scholars, among them James Alexander Robertson, Donald D. Brand, and Martin Torodash, fault Amoretti's edition for taking liberties with Pigafetta's text. Robertson accused Amoretti of committing "the sin of editing the precious document, almost  beyond recognition."  Brand describes the work as "somewhat garbled." Theodore J. Cachey Jr. (The First Voyage Around the World, (1519-1522), An Account of Magellan's Expedition by Antonio Pigafetta, New York: 1995) called Amoretti's edition as having "bowdlerized the text in an effort to 'exposit with the necessary decency the account of some strange customs written by him [Pigafetta] in frank terms which would offend the delicacy and modesty of the reader of good taste."

Creator of grand geographical illusion
Even while it is so poorly regarded Amoretti's work has left an enduring geographical puzzle—an invalid geographical assertion—which has only been recently detected.

In two footnotes on pages 66 and 72, Amoretti surmised that Magellan's port—which he named Massana and appears otherwise as Mazaua or Mazzaua in the clear calligraphic writing of the Beinecke-Yale codex, where the Armada de Molucca anchored from March 28 to April 4, 1521—may be the Limassava in a map of the Philippines by French cartographer Jacques N. Bellin.

Bellin's map is a perfect copy of a chart made by Fr. Pedro Murillo Velarde, S.J., of the Philippines in 1734. Murillo's map was such a brilliant and beautiful map many European mapmakers plagiarized it outright. To the credit of Bellin, he cites Murillo as his authority; he corrects Murillo's longitude which followed the erroneous entry of Pigafetta. The French Bellin was hydrographer to the king of France and one of the greatest and most important French cartographers of the mid-18th century. His works were of such excellence as to set a high standard and were widely copied throughout Europe. His map of the Philippines came out the same year that Murillo's map came out.

In any case, Amoretti offers one proof in support of his guess: the latitude of Limassava is at Pigafetta's latitude for Mazaua at 9°40' North. He was mistaken on two counts, Limasawa is at 9°56' North while Mazaua had three latitude readings by three members of the Armada, 9°40' N by Pigafetta, 9°20' N by Francisco Albo, and 9° N by the Genoese Pilot.

Mazaua was the port where Magellan's fleet anchored for one week. It was also the port where 22 years later, Ginés de Mafra, revisited, the only crewmember of the Armada to do so. There are other visits by Spanish and Portuguese during the entire Age of Sail, the last notable one a few months before the 1565 arrival of the Legazpi expedition being a Portuguese squadron  that virtually wiped out the entire population of the isle except for one native who was able to hide.

Limasawa, an invented word
The word Limasawa is not found in any of the over 100 languages of the Philippines. It is not found in any of the eyewitness reports that mention the episode of March 28-April 4, 1521 as written by Antonio Pigafetta, Gines de Mafra, Martín de Ayamonte, Francisco Albo, and The Genoese Pilot.

In fact, it was invented in 1667 by a Jesuit historian who had not read any of those accounts. Fr. Francisco Combés, S.J., had read three works that refer to the Mazaua episode: by Giovanni Battista Ramusio, who said the port was "Buthuan", and this Combés adopted; by Antonio de Herrera, who said it was "Mazaua", which Combés rejected; and by Fr. Francisco Colín, S.J., who said the island was Butuan. Colín pointed to another island he called Dimasaua to signify it is not (di is Bisaya for not) the isle where an Easter mass was celebrated. The island is Pigafetta's Gatighan. In the case of Combés, who wrote five years after Colín, he did not adopt Dimasaua because his story does not mention any mass at all.

Amoretti, ignorant of Colín, Combés, de Mafra, Albo, etc.
Amoretti had not read Colín and Combés and was unaware that their Dimasawa and Limasawa were born of ignorance of the true Mazaua episode. That the island whose names they invented pointed to Pigafetta's Gatighan.

Amoretti also had not read the French manuscripts of Pigafetta which described Mazaua, Magellan's lost harbor, as having plenty of gold mines, and the other firsthand accounts by de Mafra, Albo, the Genoese Pilot, and Ayamonte. These uniformly referred to an island with an excellent port. Limasawa has no anchorage.

His claim asserting identity between Limasawa and Mazaua was false from the very basic level of anchorage.

Uncritical acceptance of Amoretti
Navigation historians and Magellan scholars who followed in the wake of Amoretti adopted uncritically his Limasawa=Mazaua dictum. Not one raised any question or doubt. Among these were Lord Stanley of Alderley, Jose T. Medina, F.H.H. Guillemard, Andrea da Mosto, Charles McKew Parr, James Alexander Robertson, down to the latest authors like Laurence Bergreen. By the time Robertson came into the picture, Amoretti's guess became a certainty, this without any additional argument or evidence. Mazaua, declared Robertson, "is doubtless the Limasaua of the present day." It was de rigueur for Magellan writers to state that Limasawa was Pigafetta's Mazaua. In 2003 Bergreen broke away from this and completely disregards the name "Mazaua" altogether, he names the port Limasawa without citing Pigafetta's "Mazaua."

Amoretti name unknown in the Philippines
Philippine historians and historiographers who have written on Magellan and the Mazaua episode are totally ignorant of Amoretti. This incredible phenomenon may be explained by the practice or non-practice of modern historiography which is marked by a strict if not reverential respect for authorship.

In the Philippines, Amoretti's dictum was completely accepted but his authorship unrecognized if not indeed appropriated. His assertion was reworked in such a manner as to make it look new and original. Instead of saying what Amoretti said that "Limasawa may be Mazaua" Philippine historiographers reframed it as "the site of the first mass" (Mazaua) is not Butuan (Gian Battista Ramusio's version) but Limasawa.

The framework finally blossomed to the classic question, "Where is the site of the first mass, Limasawa or Butuan?" This proposition forces the reader to choose between two false options, an isle that has no anchorage, Limasawa, and a place that is not an isle, Butuan.

Only with the discovery of the Ginés de Mafra account and by tracing the Limasawa=Mazaua dictum to Amoretti was it possible to see that Amoretti's assertion was based on ignorance of all the eyewitness accounts which he had not read and the accounts of Colín and Combés whose invented names did not point to Magellan's port. De Mafra described a port that was in the Genoese Pilot's 9°N; at this location, all the other's testimonies converged, harmonized to create a unified whole and a consistent truth.

Amoretti's Limasaua is Pigafetta's Gatighan
The notion Amoretti propounded that Limasawa is Mazaua is based on ignorance of a basic fact: Limasawa has no anchorage as described by the Coast Pilot of 1927 published by the United States Coast and Geodetic Survey states, "Limasawa is fringed by a narrow, steep-to reef off which the water is too deep to afford good anchorage for large vessels. It also rests on a garbled text of Pigafetta by Ramusio. Finally, it comes from Combés's renaming of Pigafetta's Gatighan into Limasawa.

List of his published works

 Antonio Pigafetta, Primo viaggio intorno al globo terracqueo ossia Ragguaglio della nauigazione alle Indie orientali per la via d' occidente fatta dal caualiere Antonio Pigafetta ... sulla squadra del capit. Magaglianes negli anni 1519-1522. Ora pubblicato per la prima volta , tratto da un codice ms. della Biblioteca Ambrosiana di Milano e corredato di note da Carlo Amoretti; contiene anche: Raccolta di vocaboli fatta dal caualiere Antonio Pigafetta ne' paesi, ove durante la navigazione fece qualche dimora. Con un Transunto del Trattato di nauigazione dello stesso autore, In Milano : nella stamperia di Giuseppe Galeazzi, 1800
 Antonio Pigafetta, Premier voyage autour du monde, par le chev. Pigafetta, sur l'escadre de Magellan, pendant les annees 1519, 20, 21 et 22; suivi de l'extrait du Traite de navigation du meme auteur; et d'une notice sur le chevalier Martin Behaim, avec la description de son globe terrestre...Publie pour la premiere fois, en italien, sur un manuscrit de la Bibliotheque Ambroisienne de Milan; avec des notes; par Charles Amoretti...et traduit en francois par le meme. Paris: H.J. Jansen, [1801]
 Antonio Pigafetta, Beschreibung der von Magellan unternommenen ersten Reise um die Welt (1519-22); aus einer Handschrift der Ambros. Bibliothek zu Mayland von Amoretti zum erstenmal herausgeg. Aus d. Franz (von Ch. W. Jacobs u. F. Kries.) Mit 3 Karten. gr. 8. Gotha 1801. Just. Perthes.
Scelta di opuscoli interessanti tradotti da varie lingue, 1775-1777
 
 
 
 
 
 Nuova scelta di opuscoli interessanti sulle scienze e sulle arti tratti dagli atti delle Accademie, e dalle altre collezioni filosofiche e letterarie, dalle opere piu recenti Inglesi, Tedesche, Francesi, Latine, e Italiane, e da' manoscritti originali, e inediti da Carlo Amoretti, Milano:presso Giacomo Agnelli successore Marelli librajo-stampatore in S. Margherita, 1804
 Carlo Amoretti, Memorie storiche su la vita gli studj e le opere di Leonardo da Vinci scritte da Carlo Amoretti bibliot. nell'Ambr. di Milano ... Si aggiungono le Memorie intorno alla vita del ch. Baldassare Oltrocchi gia prefetto della stessa biblioteca, scritte dal suo successore Pietro Cighera, Milano:(presso Gaetano Motta al Malcantone), 1804
 Carlo Amoretti, Lettera su alcuni scheletri di grissi animali trovati da pochi anni in un colle piacentino : scritta da Carlo Amoretti a monsignor Giacinto Della Torre arcivescovo, Milano, 1804
 Carlo Amoretti, Della coltivazione delle patate e loro uso istruzione dell'ab Carlo Amoretti bibliotecario dell'Ambrosiana col discorso sul medesimo oggetto del conte Vincenzio Dandolo e giudizio sul merito dei due opuscoli .. - Seconda edizione fiorentina, Firenze:presso Leonardo Ciardetti all'insegna della fenice, 1817
 Carlo Amoretti, Della torba e della lignite combustibili che possno sostituirsi alle legne nel Regno d'Italia. Istruzioni di Carlo Amoretti ..., Milano:presso Giovanni Pirotta stampatore in Santa Margherita, 1810
 Carlo Amoretti, Viaggio da Milano a Nizza di Carlo Amoretti ed altro da Berlino a Nizza e ritorno da Nizza a Berlino di Giangiorgio Sulzer fatto negli anni 1775 e 1776, Milano:per Giovanni Silvestri, 1819
 Carlo Amoretti, Viaggio da Milano ai tre laghi Maggiore, di Lugano e di Como e ne' monti che li circondano di Carlo Amoretti - Quinta edizione corretta ed accresciuta, Milano:per Giovanni Silvestri, 1817
 Carlo Amoretti, Elogio letteratio del signor Alberto Fortis membro della societa italiana delle scienze, ... Scritto dal signor Cav. Carlo Amoretti. Inserito nel tomo 14. della societa italiana delle scienze, Verona:dalla tipografia di Giovanni Gambaretti, 1809
 Carlo Amoretti, Del governo dei bachi da seta detti volgarmente bigatti : istruzione tratta dal libro intitolato Dell'arte di governare i bachi da seta ... / da Carlo Amoretti - 4. ed., Milano:presso Sonzogno, 1824
 Carlo Amoretti, Della raddomanzia ossia elettrometria animale ricerche fisiche e storiche di Carlo Amoretti ..., Milano:presso Giuseppe Marelli stampatore-librajo sulla corsia del Broletto, 1812
 Carlo Amoretti, Viaggi da Berlino a Nizza e da Milano a Nizza, Milano:Agenzia libraria Savallo, 1865
 Carlo Amoretti, Memorie storiche su la vita gli studi e le opere di Lionardo da Vinci scritte da Carlo Amoretti, Milano:dalla Tipografia di Giusti, Ferrario e C., 1804
 Carlo Amoretti, Coltivazioni delle api pel regno d'Italia - Alvisopoli : N. e G. Bettoni, 1811
 Carlo Amoretti, Della coltivazione delle patate e loro uso. Istruzione di Carlo Amoretti ..., Roma, 1802
 Carlo Amoretti, Della coltivazione delle patate e loro uso. Istruzione del sig. Carlo Amoretti ... col discorso sul medesimo oggetto del sig. Vincenzo Dandolo e col giudizio sulle due opere dell'I. e R. Accad. de' Georgofili, Firenze:presso Leonardo Ciardetti all'Insegna della fenice, 1817
 Carlo Amoretti, Della torba e della lignite, combustibili che possono sostituirsi alle legne nel regno d'Italia, Milano:presso G. Pirotta, 1810
 Carlo Amoretti, Della ricerca del carbon fossile, suoi vantaggi e suo uso nel Regno d'Italia. Istruzione del cav. Carlo Amoretti .., Milano:da Gio. Bernardoni, 1811
 Carlo Amoretti, Delle torbiere esistenti nel dipartimento d'Olona e limitrofi, e de' loro vantaggi, ed usi. Ragionamento di Carlo Amoretti. Tratt. dal vol. 1. part. 2. delle Memorie dell'Istituto Nazionale Italiano, Milano:presso Camillo Scorza, e compagno stampatori-libraj nella Contrada della Cerva al n. 340, 1807
 Carlo Amoretti, Educazione delle api per la Lombardia - In Milano : da Giuseppe Galeazzi regio stampatore, 1788
 Carlo Amoretti, Viaggio da Milano ai tre laghi Maggiore, di Lugano e di Como, e ne'monti che li circondano, Milano:tip. G. Galeazzi, 1801
 Carlo Amoretti, Viaggio da Milano ai tre laghi Maggiore, di Lugano e di Como e ne' monti che li circondano di Carlo Amoretti - Sesta edizione corretta e corredata di antichi monumenti e della vita dell'autore dal dottor Giovanni Labus, Milano:per Giovanni Silvestri, 1824 [2]
 Carlo Amoretti, Viaggio da Milano ai tre laghi Maggiore, di Lugano e di Como e ne' monti che li circondano, Milano : dalla Tipografia Scorza e Compagno, 1806
 Carlo Amoretti, Del governo de' bachi da seta detti volgarmente bigatti : istruzione tratta dal libro intitolato Dell'arte di governare i bachi da seta, opera del fu conte Dandolo, Forli : tip. Casali, 1837
 Carlo Amoretti, Viaggio da Milano ai tre laghi: Maggiore, di Lugano e di Como e ne' monti che li circondano - Reprint, Milano:Studio editoriale Insubria, 1824
 Carlo Amoretti, Delle macchine aerostatiche, Da: Opuscoli scelti sulle scienze e sulle arti, Milano, 1778-1796
 Istruzione pratica per la coltivazione de' terreni incolti. Tradotta dal francese, Milano:nell'Imperial Monistero di S. Ambrogio Magg., 1780
 Carlo Amoretti, Viaggio da Milano ai tre laghi Maggiore, di Lugano e di Como. Milano: presso Giuseppe Galeazzi, 1794
 Carlo Amoretti, Appendice al viaggio di Ferrer Maldonado. Lettera apologetica di C.A. al Sig. B. di L., Milano : Tipografia Pirotta, Maggio 1813

Sources
 "Carlo Amoretti", pp. 492–494, in: The Biographical Dictionary of the Society for the Diffusion of Useful Knowledge, Volume II. Part II. London 1843.
 Belli, Guido. "People: Carlo Amoretti." Provincia di Varese. 1 February 2007,http://www.provincia.va.it/preziosita/ukvarese/pers/caramo.htm>
 Bernardi, Walter. "The Controversy on Animal Electricity in Eighteenth Century Italy: Galvani, Volta and Others." Revue d'histoire des sciences 54, 1 2001 14.<http://ppp.unipv.it/Collana/Pages/Libri/Saggi/NuovaVoltiana_PDF/quattro.pdf>.
 Colín, Francisco. 1663. Labor evangelica de los obreros de la Compañia de Jesús, fundación y progresos de Islas Filipinas. Pablo Pastells (ed.), 3 vols. Barcelona 1900.
 Combés, Francisco. 1667. Historia de las islas de Mindanao, Iolo y sus adyacentes. W.E. Retana (ed.). Madrid 1897.
 de Jesus, Vicente C. (2002). Mazaua Historiography. Retrieved February 27, 2007, from MagellansPortMazaua mailing list: http://tech.groups.yahoo.com/group/MagellansPortMazaua/files/Mazaua%20Historiography/ --
 Foronda, Marcelino A., Jr. (1981). "The First Mass in the Philippines as a Problem in Philippine Historiography". Kasaysayan, Vol. VI, Number 1-4, 3-7.
 Herrera, Antonio de. 1601. Historia general de los hechos de los Castellanos en las islas y tierrafirme del mar oceano, t. VI. Angel Gonzalez Palencia (ed.). Madrid 1947.
 Pigafetta, Antonio. c. 1523. The First Voyage Around the World (1519-1522), by Antonio Pigafetta. Theodore J. Cachey Jr. (ed. based on James Alexander Robertson's English translation of the Ambrosiana codex as transcribed by Andrea da Mosto), New York: 1995.
 Torodash, Martin. 1971. "Magellan Historiography." In: Hispanic American Historical Review, LI, Pp. 313–335.

External links 
 Pictures and texts of Viaggio da Milano ai tre laghi Maggiore, di Lugano e di Como e ne' monti che li circondano by Carlo Amoretti can be found in the database VIATIMAGES.

1741 births
1816 deaths
People from Imperia
Italian exploration of the Pacific
Italian explorers
19th-century Italian scientists
18th-century Italian scientists